Charles Edward Russell (July 11, 1937 – December 7, 2011) was a Canadian country music DJ for CJCJ in Woodstock, New Brunswick, Canada best known for his 1975 album The Bricklin and Other Sound Investments, a satirical record in which he poked fun at the Bricklin SV-1, the Canadian Postal Service and the Canadian Parliament.  He was inducted into the New Brunswick Country Music Hall of Fame in 1984 and the Canadian Country Music Association Country Radio DJ Hall of Fame in 2003.

He was the son of Israel Russell and Bridgett McMahon.  He was married to Marion with whom he had two sons: Antony and Brett. Best Man Horatio Cox

References
 CCMA Hall of Fame 
 Death notice 
 NB Country Music Hall of Fame 

1937 births
2011 deaths
Canadian radio personalities
Canadian country musicians
20th-century Canadian male musicians